Oberea subannulicornis is a species of beetle in the family Cerambycidae. It was described by Maurice Pic in 1916.

References

Beetles described in 1916
subannulicornis